Bard College is a private liberal arts college in Annandale-on-Hudson, New York. The campus overlooks the Hudson River and Catskill Mountains, and is within the Hudson River Historic District—a National Historic Landmark.

Founded in 1860, the institution consists of a liberal arts college and a conservatory, as well as eight graduate programs offering over 20 graduate degrees in the arts and sciences. The college has a network of over 35 affiliated programs, institutes, and centers, spanning twelve cities, five states, seven countries, and four continents.

History

Origins and early years 

During much of the nineteenth century, the land now owned by Bard was mainly composed of several country estates. These estates were called Blithewood, Bartlett, Sands, Cruger's Island, and Ward Manor/Almont.

In 1853, John Bard and Margaret Bard purchased a part of the Blithewood estate and renamed it Annandale. John Bard was the grandson of Samuel Bard, a prominent doctor, a founder of Columbia University's medical school,  and physician to George Washington. John Bard was also the nephew of the Rev. John McVickar, a professor at Columbia University. The family had strong connections with the Episcopal Church and Columbia.

The following year, in 1854, John and Margaret established a parish school on their estate in order to educate the area's children. A wood-frame cottage, known today as Bard Hall, served as a school on weekdays and a chapel on weekends. In 1857, the Bards expanded the parish by building the Chapel of the Holy Innocents next to Bard Hall.  During this time, John Bard remained in close contact with the New York leaders of the Episcopal Church. The Church suggested that he found a theological college.

With the promise of outside financial support, John Bard donated the unfinished Chapel, and the surrounding , to the diocese in November 1858. In March 1860, St. Stephen's College was founded. In 1861, construction began on the first St. Stephen's College building, a stone collegiate gothic dormitory called Aspinwall. During its initial years, the college relied on wealthy benefactors, like trustee Cornelius Vanderbilt, for funding.

The college began taking shape within four decades. In 1866, Ludlow Hall, an administrative building, was erected. Preston Hall was built in 1873 and used as a refectory. A set of four dormitories, collectively known as Stone Row, were completed in 1891. And in 1895, the Greek revival Hoffman Memorial Library was built. The school officially changed its name to Bard College in 1934 in honor of its founder.

Growth and secularization 

In the 20th century, social and cultural changes amongst New York's high society would bring about the demise of the great estates. In 1914, Louis Hamersley purchased the fire-damaged Ward Manor/Almont estate and erected a Tudor style mansion and gatehouse, or what is today known as Ward Manor. Hamersley expanded his estate in 1926 by acquiring the abandoned Cruger's Island estate. That same year, after Hamersley's combined estate was purchased by William Ward, it was donated to charity and served as a retirement home for almost four decades.

By the mid-1900s, Bard's campus significantly expanded. The Blithewood estate was donated to the college in 1951, and in 1963, Bard purchased  of the Ward Manor estate, including the main manor house. The rest of the Ward Manor estate is now the  Tivoli Bays nature preserve.

In 1919, Fr. Bernard Iddings Bell became Bard's youngest president at the age of 34. His adherence to classical education, decorum, and dress eventually clashed with the school's push towards Deweyism and secularization, and he resigned in 1933.

In 1928, Bard merged with Columbia University, serving as an undergraduate school similar to Barnard College. Under the agreement, Bard remained affiliated with the Episcopal Church and retained control of its finances. The merger raised Bard's prestige; however, it failed to provide financial support to the college during the Great Depression. So dire was Bard's financial situation that in 1932, then-Governor of New York and College trustee Franklin D. Roosevelt sent a telegram to the likes of John D. Rockefeller, Jr., George Eastman and Frederick William Vanderbilt requesting donations for the college.

On May 26, 1933, Dr. Donald Tewksbury, a Columbia professor, was appointed dean of the college. Although dean for only four years, Tewksbury had a lasting impact on the school. Tewksbury, an educational philosopher, had extensive ideas regarding higher education. While he was dean, Tewksbury steered the college into a more secular direction and changed its name from St. Stephen's to Bard. He also placed a heavy academic emphasis on the arts, something atypical of colleges at the time, and set the foundations for Bard's Moderation and Senior Project requirement. While Tewksbury never characterized Bard's curriculum as "progressive," the school would later be considered an early adopter of progressive education. In his 1943 study of early progressive colleges, titled General Education in the Progressive College, Louis T. Benezet used Bard as one of his three case studies.

During the 1940s, Bard provided a haven for intellectual refugees fleeing Europe. These included Hannah Arendt, the political theorist, Stefan Hirsch, the precisionist painter; Felix Hirsch, the political editor of the Berliner Tageblatt; the violinist Emil Hauser; the linguist Hans Marchand; the noted psychologist Werner Wolff; and the philosopher Heinrich Blücher.
Arendt is buried at Bard, alongside her husband Heinrich Blücher, as is eminent novelist Philip Roth.

In 1944, as a result of World War II, enrollment significantly dropped putting financial stress on the college. In order to increase enrollment, the college became co-educational, thereby severing all ties with Columbia. The college became an independent, secular, institution in 1944. Thus enrollment more than doubled, from 137 students in 1944, to 293 in 1947.  In the 1950s, with the addition of the Blithewood estate and Tewksbury Hall, the college would increase its enrollment by 150 students.

Late twentieth and early twenty-first century 

Donald Fagen and Walter Becker's experiences at Bard prompted them to write the 1973 song "My Old School" for their rock group, Steely Dan.  Fagen wrote another Steely Dan song, "Rikki Don't Lose That Number", about novelist, artist and former Bard faculty spouse Rikki Ducornet.

In 2020, Bard College, along with Central European University, became the founding members of the Open Society University Network, a collaborative global education initiative endowed with US$1 billion. As part of this new initiative, the college received a US$100 million gift from the Open Society Foundations which ranks among the largest financial contributions to a U.S. institution in recent history.

In June 2021, Bard College was declared an 'undesirable institution' in Russia, becoming the first international higher education organization to be branded with this designation. Bard president Botstein hypothesize that this tag was due their association with and funding from the Open Society Foundations (also classified 'undesirable' in Russia) and related conspiracy theories about George Soros.

Campus 
The campus of Bard College is in Annandale-on-Hudson, a hamlet in Dutchess County, New York, United States, in the town of Red Hook. Campus buildings represent varied architectural styles, but the campus remains heavily influenced by the Collegiate Gothic and Postmodern styles.

Bard's historic buildings are associated with the early development of the college and the history of the Hudson River estates (see Bard College History). During a late twentieth-century building boom, the college embraced a trend of building signature buildings designed by prominent architects like Venturi, Gehry, and Viñoly.

In January 2016, Bard purchased Montgomery Place, a  estate adjacent to the Bard campus, with significant historic and cultural assets. The estate consists of a historic mansion, a farm, and some 20 smaller buildings. The college purchased the property from Historic Hudson Valley, the historical preservation organization that had owned Montgomery Place since the late 1980s. The addition of this property brings Bard's total campus size to nearly  along the Hudson River in Annandale-on-Hudson, New York.

Academics 
Bard is a college of the liberal arts and sciences. In the undergraduate college, Bard offers Bachelor of Arts and Bachelor of Science degrees. There are 23 academic departments that offer over 40 major programs, as well as 12 interdisciplinary concentrations. The college was the first in the nation to offer a human rights major. Its most popular undergraduate majors, based on 2021 graduates, were:
Social Sciences (140)
Fine/Studio Arts (106)
English Language and Literature/Letters (81)
Biological and Physical Sciences (80)

In the three weeks preceding their first semester, first-year students attend the Language and Thinking (L&T) program, an intensive, writing-centered introduction to the liberal arts. The interdisciplinary program, established in 1981, aims to "cultivate habits of thoughtful reading and discussion, clear articulation, accurate self-critique, and productive collaboration." The program covers philosophy, history, science, poetry, fiction, and religion. In 2011, the core readings included works by Hannah Arendt, Franz Kafka, Frans de Waal, Stephen Jay Gould, Clifford Geertz, M. NourbeSe Philip, and Sophocles.

The capstone of the Bard undergraduate experience is the Senior Project, commonly referred to as SPROJ amongst its students. As with moderation, this project takes different forms in different departments. Many students write a paper of around eighty pages, which is then, as with work for moderation, critiqued by a board of three professors. Arts students must organize a series of concerts, recitals, or shows, or produce substantial creative work; math and science students, as well as some social science students, undertake research projects.

Rankings and awards 

In its 2022-2023 edition of college rankings, U.S. News & World Report ranked Bard 60th overall, 5th in "Most Innovative Schools", tied at 38th for "Best Undergraduate Teaching", tied at #70 in "Top Performers on Social Mobility", tied at #19 in "First-Year Experiences", and 19th for "Best Value" out of 210 "National Liberal Arts Colleges" in the United States.

In September 2011, Travel+Leisure named the college as one of the most beautiful campuses in the United States.

Bard has been named a top producer of U.S. Fulbright Scholars. Many Bard alumni have also been named Watson Fellows, Critical Language Scholarship recipients, Davis Projects for Peace winners, Rhodes Scholars, Marshall Scholars, and Peace Corps fellows, among other postgraduate awards.

Undergraduate admissions
For 2022-2023, U.S. News & World Report found Bard's admissions to be "more selective" with an acceptance rate of 60%. Bard does not require applicants to submit SAT or ACT test scores in order to apply. As an alternative, applicants may take an examination composed of 19 essay questions in four categories: Social Studies; Languages and Literature; Arts; and Science, Mathematics, and Computing, with applicants required to complete three 2,500-word essays covering three of the four categories. For admitted students who submitted test scores, 50% had an SAT score between 1296 and 1468 or an ACT score between 28 and 33, with a reported average GPA of 3.79. Admissions officials consider a student's GPA a very important academic factor. Honors, AP, and IB classes are important, an applicant's high school class rank is considered, and letters of recommendation are considered very important for admissions officials at Bard.

Endowment 

Bard has access to multiple, distinct endowments. Bard, along with Central European University, is a founding member of the Open Society University Network, endowed with $1 billion from philanthropist George Soros, which is a network of universities to operate throughout the world to better prepare students for current and future global challenges through integrated teaching and research. Bard maintains its own endowment of approximately $267 million, a large portion of which is exclusively dedicated to its graduate programs in the arts. In July 2020, Bard received a gift of $100 million from the Open Society Foundations, which will dispense $10 million yearly over a period of ten years. In April 2021, Bard received a $500 million endowment challenge grant from George Soros. Once matched, on a five-year timeline, Bard will have an endowment of more than $1 billion.

Programs, centers, and associated institutes 

Bard has developed several innovative graduate programs and research institutes, including the Milton Avery Graduate School of the Arts, the Levy Economics Institute which began offering a Masters of Science in Economic Theory and Policy in 2014, the Center for Curatorial Studies and Art in Contemporary Culture, the Bard Center for Environmental Policy, the Bard College Conservatory of Music, the ICP-Bard Program in Advanced Photographic Studies in Manhattan, the Master of Arts in Teaching Program (MAT), the Bard College Clemente Program, and the Bard Graduate Center in Manhattan.

In 1990, Bard College acquired, on permanent loan, art collector Marieluise Hessel's substantial collection of important contemporary artwork. In 2006, Hessel contributed another $8 million (USD) for the construction of a 17,000-square-foot addition to Bard's Center for Curatorial Studies building, in which the collection is exhibited.

The Bard Prison Initiative (BPI) provides a liberal arts degree to incarcerated individuals (prison education) in five prisons in New York State, and enrolls nearly 200 students. Since federal funding for prison education programs was eliminated in 1994, BPI is one of only a small number of programs of its kind in the country.

Bard awards the Bard Fiction Prize annually to "a promising emerging writer who is an American citizen aged 39 years or younger at the time of application". The prize is $30,000 and an appointment as writer-in-residence at the college.

The Hannah Arendt Center for Politics and Humanities is located at Bard College. The center hosts an annual public conference, offers courses, runs various related academic programs, and houses research fellows, and is directed by Dr. Roger Berkowitz, a legal scholar and an associate professor of politics, philosophy, and human rights.

In February 2009, Bard announced the first dual degree program between a Palestinian university and an American institution of higher education. The college entered into a collaboration with Al-Quds University involving an honors college, a master's program in teaching and a model high school.

In accordance with AlQuds-Bard requirements, students are not allowed to decide their major during the first year of their studies; instead, as a liberal arts college, students are advised to diverge in different classes that would allow them to decide what program they would like to take interest in as in the following year. Students are encouraged to look upon different classes to help them decide the subject they would mostly enjoy studying. Bard gives students the opportunity to dissect different programs before committing to a specific major. As a policy, throughout a student's undergraduate years, they must distribute their credits among different courses so that they can liberally experience the different courses Bard has to offer.

In June 2011, Bard officially acquired the Longy School of Music in Cambridge, Massachusetts, and in November 2011, Bard took ownership of the European College of Liberal Arts in Berlin, Germany, to become Bard College Berlin.

In 2013, Bard entered into a comprehensive agreement with Soochow University in Suzhou, China, that will include a joint program between the Soochow University School of Music and the Bard College Conservatory of Music, exploration leading to the establishment of The Bard College Liberal Arts Academy at Soochow University, and student exchange.

In 2020, Bard announced that through the new Franklin and Eleanor Roosevelt Advanced Achievement Scholars program the college will offer admission to high school juniors within 120 miles from the college based on an essay process based on the popular Bard Entrance Exam, first launched in 2013.

Student life 

Over 120 student clubs are financed through Bard's Convocation Fund, which is distributed once a semester by an elected student body and ratified during a public forum.
Bard College has one print newspaper, the Bard Free Press, which was awarded a Best in Show title by the Associated Collegiate Press in 2013. In 2003, the Bard Free Press won Best Campus Publication in SPIN Magazines first annual Campus Awards. Student-run literary magazines include the semiannual Lux, The Moderator, and Sui Generis, a journal of translations and of original poetry in languages other than English. The Draft, a human rights journal, the Bard Journal of the Social Sciences, Bard Science Journal, and Qualia, a philosophy journal, are also student-published. Bard Papers is a privately funded literary magazine operated jointly between faculty and students.

Other prominent student groups include: the International Students Organization (ISO), Afropulse, Latin American Student Organization (LASO), Caribbean Student Association (CSA), Asian Student Organization (ASO), Bard Musical Theatre Company (BMTC), Black Student Organization (BSO), Anti-Capitalism Feminist Coalition, Body Image Discussion Group, Self-Injury Support and Discussion, Bard Film Committee, Queer Student Association, Trans Life Collective, The Scale Project, Student Labor Dialogue, Bard Debate Union, Bard Model UN, Surrealist Training Circus, Bard Bike Co-Op, Bard Bars, Bard POC Theater Ensemble, and college radio station WXBC. WXBC was founded in 1947. In 2006, WXBC was nominated for "Station of the Year" and "Biggest Improvement" in the CMJ College Radio Awards.

Bard has a strong independent music scene considering its isolation and size. The college's Old Gym was once a popular location for concerts and parties in the 1980s, 1990s, and early 2000s. In 2004, the Old Gym was shut down and in spring 2006 transformed into a student-run theater by students Brel Froebe, Julie Rossman, and Kell Condon. Many activities that once took place there now occur in the smaller SMOG building. SMOG is now primarily used as a music venue featuring student-run bands. Student-run theater is also popular: dozens of student directed and written productions are put on each semester and a 24 Hour Theater Festival is held at least once a year.

Athletics 
Bard College teams participate as a member of the National Collegiate Athletic Association's Division III. The Raptors are a member of the Liberty League. Prior conference affiliations include the Skyline Conference and the former Hudson Valley Athletic Conference. Women's sports include basketball, cross country, lacrosse, soccer, swimming & diving, tennis, track & field, volleyball and squash. Men's sports include baseball, basketball, cross country, soccer, squash, swimming & diving, tennis, track & field and volleyball.

One of the more popular club sports on campus is rugby. Bard College Rugby Football Club fields men's and women's teams that compete in the Tristate Conference, affiliated with National Collegiate Rugby. Additional club sports include: ultimate frisbee, fencing, and equestrian.

Alumni and faculty 

Notable alumni of Bard include fraternal songwriters Richard M. Sherman and Robert B. Sherman, comedian and actor Chevy Chase (1967); Walter Becker and Donald Fagen of Steely Dan (1969); actors Blythe Danner (1965), Adrian Grenier, Gaby Hoffmann, Larry Hagman; filmmakers Gia Coppola, Todd Haynes (MFA), Sadie Bennings (MFA), Lana Wachowski (dropped out); Herb Ritts, photographer; Christopher Guest, actor/director (This is Spinal Tap, Waiting for Guffman, Best in Show); songwriters Billy Steinberg (Madonna's "Like A Virgin," Cyndi Lauper's "True Colors," The Bangles "Eternal Flame"); Anne Bogart, theater director; Howard E. Koch, screenwriter (Casablanca, Letter from an Unknown Woman); David Cote, writer; Adam Conover, comedian and creator of Adam Ruins Everything; Raphael Bob-Waksberg, comedian and creator of Bojack Horseman; classical composer Bruce Wolosoff; Ronan Farrow, journalist who exposed the Harvey Weinstein scandal; writer and social theorist Albert Jay Nock, journalist and author Matt Taibbi, and Adam Yauch of the Beastie Boys. Other notable alumni include artist Freya Powell and Tschabalala Self.

Among the college's most well-known former faculty are Hannah Arendt, Toni Morrison, Heinrich Blücher, Roy Lichtenstein, Mary McCarthy, Arthur Penn, John Ashbery, Richard Teitelbaum, Mary Lee Settle and Chinua Achebe. Current faculty who are well-known include Stephen Shore, An-My Lê, Neil Gaiman, Bill T. Jones, Daniel Mendelsohn, Joan Tower, Masha Gessen, Kelly Reichardt, Francine Prose,  Ann Lauterbach, Charles Burnett, Valeria Luiselli, Tan Dun, Tschabalala Self, and Sky Hopinka.

Gallery

References

External links 

 
 Official athletics website

 
Columbia University
1860 establishments in New York (state)
Educational institutions established in 1860
Liberal arts colleges in New York (state)
Red Hook, New York
Annandale-on-Hudson, New York
Universities and colleges affiliated with the Episcopal Church (United States)
Universities and colleges in Dutchess County, New York
Private universities and colleges in New York (state)
Tourist attractions in Dutchess County, New York
Undesirable organizations in Russia